The GM C Platform was a rear wheel drive (RWD) automobile chassis used by General Motors for its full-sized cars from 1925 through 1984. From at least 1941, when the B-body followed suit in adopting the C-body's pioneering lower and wider bodystyle with no running boards, it may be viewed as a larger and more upscale version of the GM B platform.  It was also related to the limousine D platform. With the introduction of a severely downsized front-wheel drive new GM C platform in 1985 it was redesignated as GM's D platform and continued in production for a number of Cadillac models through 1996.

Among the earlier models the C-body was used for were the Pontiac Series 24/29 Torpedo, Oldsmobile 98, the Buick Roadmaster, Super and 1958 Limited, the LaSalle Series 52, and all mid-level Cadillacs starting with the Cadillac Series 355.

Generally the C-Body was for the top-of-the-line models of multiple General Motors divisions including the Oldsmobile 98 and Buick Electra, and the base model for multiple Cadillacs, including the Series 6200 Calais, the Series 6300 de Ville, the Series 6400 Eldorado, the Series 6000 Fleetwood Sixty Special and the Fleetwood Brougham.

Use

References

List of GM VIN codes

C (RWD)